Tamara Volskaya is a performing musician whose principal instrument is the domra. She graduated Kyiv Conservatory of Music, is a Merited Artist of Russia, a Laureate of USSR music competitions, and a professor at the Mussorgsky Ural State Conservatory of Yekaterinburg, Russia.

She also performs on the mandolin. She is a recognized authority in the mandolin world, a regular guest artist and instructor of the Classical Mandolin Society of America and BDAA (Balalaika and Domra Association of America and Canada). She regularly appears as a domra and mandolin soloist with orchestras across the US, the former USSR, and Canada, and has performed in Europe, Australia, Israel, and Japan. Tamara has performed at such prestigious venues as Weill Recital Hall of Carnegie Music Hall, Avery Fisher Hall, Library of Congress, with Seattle Chamber Orchestra, New American Orchestra of NYC, Metropolitan Opera, etc.

Tamara teaches as well as performs. She organized and headed the Folk Instrument Faculty at the Conservatory’s School for Gifted Students in Yekaterinburg, Russia.  Many of her students have won international and national competitions. She has conducted numerous master classes on the domra and mandolin worldwide and is the author of several scholarly works on the domra.

In America, Tamara worked to popularize Russian Folk instruments in the cultural world of New York City.  Together with her husband, Anatoliy Trofimov, a bayan player and a brilliant arranger, they form the "Russian Duo." They also organized “Russian Carnival,” a Russian folk instruments ensemble in New York City. The ensemble’s highlight was its performance at Avery Fisher Hall as part of the “Russian Splendor” program.

Tamara’s repertoire, both on domra and mandolin, spans a wide range of musical periods and styles, from classical to modern, as well as folk music based on Russian, Gypsy, Jewish, and Eastern European themes. It includes the great violin classics such as “Introduction and Rondo Capriccioso” (Saint-Saëns), “Zigeunerweisen” (Sarasate), as well as Vivaldi’s Concertos, “Russian Dance” from Swan Lake (Tchaikovsky), “Rhapsody in Blue” (Gershwin) and selections by Scarlatti, Beethoven, Chopin, Kreisler, Shostakovich.

References

External links
Tamara Volskaya's site

Russian musicians
Living people
Year of birth missing (living people)